Arthrobacter cryoconiti is a psychrophilic, Gram-positive, aerobic and non-motile bacterium species from the genus Arthrobacter which has been isolated from cryoconite from the Banker glacier in the Ötztaler Alpen in Austria.

References

Further reading

External links
Type strain of Arthrobacter cryoconiti at BacDive -  the Bacterial Diversity Metadatabase

Bacteria described in 2012
Psychrophiles
Micrococcaceae